Sandro Sene Anibal Embaló (born 1 May 1996) known as Sandro Sakho, is a Portuguese footballer who plays as a defender for Finnish club Oulu.

Club career
On 25 August 2018, Sakho made his professional debut with Ermis Aradippou in a 2018–19 Cypriot First Division match against AEL Limassol.

On 18 November 2021, he signed with Oulu in Finland.

Personal life
Sakho is of Bissau-Guinean descent.

References

External links

Sandro Sakho at ZeroZero

1996 births
Living people
Portuguese footballers
Portuguese expatriate footballers
Portuguese people of Bissau-Guinean descent
Association football defenders
Meistriliiga players
Cypriot First Division players
National League (English football) players
Genoa C.F.C. players
JK Tallinna Kalev players
Ermis Aradippou FC players
C.D. Fátima players
Dulwich Hamlet F.C. players
AC Oulu players
Portuguese expatriate sportspeople in Spain
Expatriate footballers in Spain
Portuguese expatriate sportspeople in Italy
Expatriate footballers in Italy
Portuguese expatriate sportspeople in Cyprus
Expatriate footballers in Cyprus
Portuguese expatriate sportspeople in Estonia
Expatriate footballers in Estonia
Portuguese expatriate sportspeople in Northern Ireland
Expatriate association footballers in Northern Ireland
Portuguese expatriate sportspeople in Finland
Expatriate footballers in Finland
Footballers from Lisbon